Rita Ramanauskaitė (born 22 November 1970) is a female javelin thrower from Lithuania. Born in Kaunas, her personal best throw of 62.69 metres, achieved in June 2000 in Saint-Denis, is the Lithuanian record.

She competed at the World Championships in 1995, 1997, 1999, 2001 and 2003 and the Olympic Games in 1996, 2000 and 2004, but only reached the final round in 1997, when she finished twelfth.

Achievements

References
 
 sports-reference

1970 births
Living people
Lithuanian female javelin throwers
Athletes (track and field) at the 1996 Summer Olympics
Athletes (track and field) at the 2000 Summer Olympics
Athletes (track and field) at the 2004 Summer Olympics
Olympic athletes of Lithuania